Gerrit-Jan van Velze (born 21 February 1988) is a South African rugby union footballer. He plays for Bath Rugby in the Gallagher Premiership. He is a versatile forward and can play as a lock, flanker or number 8.

He joined Worcester Warriors ahead of the 2014-15 English Premiership season.

He has signed for Bath Rugby ahead of the 2022-23 English Premiership season.

References

1988 births
Living people
People from Govan Mbeki Local Municipality
Afrikaner people
South African people of Dutch descent
South African rugby union players
Rugby union flankers
Rugby union number eights
Bulls (rugby union) players
Blue Bulls players
University of Pretoria alumni
South African expatriate rugby union players
Expatriate rugby union players in England
South African expatriate sportspeople in England
South Africa Under-20 international rugby union players
Northampton Saints players
Worcester Warriors players
Tel Aviv Heat players
Rugby union players from Mpumalanga
South African expatriate sportspeople in Israel
Expatriate rugby union players in Israel